Charuchandra College is an undergraduate college of science, arts and commerce with 8 science departments including statistics NAAC grade B++ and  of 2.59 in Kolkata, India. It is affiliated to the University of Calcutta.

Notable alumni
 Dolon Roy, actress
 Pronay Halder,  footballer
 Swadesh Bharati, poet
 Swapna Barman, athlete

See also 
 List of colleges affiliated to the University of Calcutta
 Education in India
 Education in West Bengal

References

External links

University of Calcutta affiliates
Educational institutions established in 1947
1947 establishments in India